Inferior ramus may refer to:
 Inferior ramus of the ischium
 Inferior pubic ramus